The current Chairman Enquiries & Anti-Corruption Establishment is Dr. Muhammad Nawaz Shaikh.

The Chairman Enquiries & Anti-Corruption Establishment, commonly referred to as Chairman Anti-Corruption, is to head the Enquiries and Anti-Corruption Establishment. The position of Chairman E&ACE is usually held by a Grade-21 officer. It is regarded as one of the most senior positions in the Government of Sindh.

Working directly under the Chief Minister and Chief Secretary, the Chairman may take up any pending or fresh enquiry regarding any department. Thus the Chairman has to keep close liaison with Heads of Departments and Divisional Commissioners to unearth cases of corruption. There are 3 levels of committee's in Sindh province. The first and top-most committee is called Provincial Anti-Corruption Committee abbreviated as (ACC-I). The Chairman of ACC-1 is the Chief Secretary, while the Chairman E&ACE is the Secretary and Senior Member. Then there is the Division Anti-Corruption Committee and lastly the District Anti-Corruption Committee.

Chairman E&ACE also commands over the Anti-Corruption Police, which is a specialised force which conducts raids and traps. The Anti-Corruption Police is also used for the protection of higher-ups in the Anti-Corruption Department.

References 

Civil service of Pakistan
Government of Sindh